Alocasia wentii, the hardy elephant's ear, is a species of flowering plant in the family Araceae, native to the highlands of New Guinea. Occasionally kept as a houseplant, the unimproved species and some variegated cultivars are commercially available.

References

wentii
House plants
Endemic flora of New Guinea
Plants described in 1916